Horton Creek is a tributary of Oxbow Creek in Susquehanna County and Wyoming County, in Pennsylvania, in the United States. The creek is not designated as an impaired waterbody. The surficial geology in its vicinity mainly consists of alluvium, Wisconsinan Till, Wisconsinan Ice-Contact Stratified Drift, alluvial terrace, and wetlands.

Course
Horton Creek begins in a wetland in Springville Township, Susquehanna County. It flows south-southeast for a short distance, entering a lake and exiting Springville Township and Susquehanna County.

Upon exiting Susquehanna County, Horton Creek enters Wyoming County and flows along the border between Lemon Township and Nicholson Township. From the southern end of the lake, the creek flows south for several tenths of a mile before turning south-southeast. Over the next several tenths of a mile, it flows through a valley, passing Seely Hill and Vargo Hill. The creek then turns south-southwest for several tenths of a mile, leaving the township line and entering Lemon Township. It then turns south-southeast for several tenths of a mile before reaching the end of its valley and turning east-southeast for a short distance. At this point, the creek turns south-southwest and reaches its confluence with Oxbow Creek.

Hydrology
Horton Creek is not designated as an impaired waterbody.

Geography and geology

The surficial geology along the lower reaches of Horton Creek mainly consists of alluvium. However, a till known as Wisconsinan Till lines the creek's valley. There are also patches of alluvial terrace and Wisconsinan Ice-Contact Stratified Drift near its mouth. In the creek's upper reaches, the surficial geology immediately adjacent to the creek is also alluvium, while the surficial geology in most of the rest of the valley is Wisconsinan Till. There are also two wetland patches near the creek in this reach.

Watershed
The mouth of the creek is in the United States Geological Survey quadrangle of Tunkhannock. However, its source is in the quadrangle of Springville. The mouth of the creek is located close to St. Andrews Camp.

History
Horton Creek was entered into the Geographic Names Information System on August 2, 1979. Its identifier in the Geographic Names Information System is 1177475.

A 2004 act authorized a $260,000 bridge replacement of a bridge carrying State Route 1008 over Horton Creek in Lemon Township, Wyoming County.

See also
Oxbow Inlet, next tributary of Oxbow Creek going upstream
List of rivers of Pennsylvania

References

Rivers of Wyoming County, Pennsylvania
Tributaries of Tunkhannock Creek
Rivers of Pennsylvania
Rivers of Susquehanna County, Pennsylvania